Carlos César (born 1956) is a Portuguese politician.

Carlos César may also refer to:

Carlos César (football manager) (born 1943), Brazilian football manager
Carlos César (footballer) (born 1987), Brazilian footballer